The list of people indicted in the International Criminal Tribunal for Rwanda includes all individuals who have been indicted on any counts of genocide, crimes against humanity, war crimes, or contempt of the Tribunal by the Prosecutor of the International Criminal Tribunal for Rwanda (ICTR) pursuant to the Statute of the Tribunal. An individual is indicted when a Trial Chamber confirms an indictment submitted to it by the Prosecutor. The Trial Chamber may also "issue
such orders and warrants for the arrest, detention, surrender or transfer of persons, and any other
orders as may be required for the conduct of the trial."

Overview 
The ICTR indicted a total of 96 individuals. One individual remains at large as a fugitive and if captured will be tried before the International Residual Mechanism for Criminal Tribunals (the IRMCT). One individual is on trial before the IRMCT. The ICTR (or the IRMCT as its successor) convicted 61 individuals: 28 of whom are currently serving sentences, 22 of whom have completed their sentences, and 11 of whom died while serving their sentences. The Tribunal acquitted 14 individuals and transferred the cases against 10 individuals to national jurisdictions. Proceedings against nine individuals ended before a final judgment was rendered: two of whom had their charges dismissed by the Tribunal, two of whom had their charges withdrawn by the Prosecutor, and five of whom died.

List of indictees 
The list below details the counts against each individual indicted in the Tribunal and his or her current status. The column titled G lists the number of counts (if any) of the crime of genocide with which an individual has been charged. H list the number of counts of crimes against humanity, W the number of counts of war crimes and C the number of counts of contempt of the Tribunal. Note that these are the counts with which an individual was indicted, not convicted.

See also 
 List of Axis personnel indicted for war crimes
 List of people indicted in the International Criminal Court
 List of people indicted in the International Criminal Tribunal for the former Yugoslavia

References

External links 
Official Web site of the Mechanism for International Criminal Tribunals (IRMCT)
IRMCT Cases Database for Rwanda  providing direct case based access to the Judicial Records and Archives Database (JRAD)
International Criminal Tribunal for Rwanda (ICTR) and its ICTR Basic Document and Case Law database for Rwanda
Trial International, Trial Watch for Rwanda with facts, legal procedure and context for each case. The cases for Ruanda cover UN tribunal ICTR, IRMCT and the rwandan Gacaca court.  

International Criminal Tribunal for Rwanda
Dynamic lists
 
Rwandan genocide
International Criminal Tribunal for Rwanda